Computer Acquire is a 1980 video game published by Avalon Hill for the Apple II, Atari 8-bit family, Commodore PET, and TRS-80.

Gameplay
Computer Acquire is an adaptation of the board game Acquire that allows the player to play against the computer choosing from five levels of difficulty.

Reception
Jon Mishcon reviewed Computer Acquire in The Space Gamer No. 45. Mishcon commented that "If you enjoy multiparameter games and you're willing to spend twice that time just to learn what does what, then Acquire may be for you. Otherwise wait for the second edition of the rules."

References

External links
 (Atari version)
Softalk review
Review in 80 Micro
Review in C&VG

1980 video games
Avalon Hill video games
Apple II games
Atari 8-bit family games
Commodore PET games
TRS-80 games
Video games based on board games